George Potter may refer to:
 George Potter (trade unionist) (1832–1893), English trade unionist
 George Potter (politician) (1883–1945), Australian politician 
 George Potter (cricketer) (1878–?), English cricketer
 George William Potter (1831–1919), builder, estate agent and surveyor in Hampstead, London
 George Richard Potter (1900–1982), British historian
 George Potter (MP for West Looe), member of parliament for West Looe